The Journal of Applied Crystallography is a peer-reviewed scientific journal published by Wiley-Blackwell on behalf of the International Union of Crystallography. It was established in 1968 and covers the application of crystallography and crystallographic techniques. William Parrish (1914–1991) chaired the committee that started the journal. The Journal of Applied Crystallography publishes articles on the crystallographic methods that are used to study crystalline and non-crystalline matter with neutrons, X-rays and electrons, their application in condensed matter research, materials science and the life sciences, and their use in identifying phase transformations and structural changes of defects, structure-property relationships, interfaces and surfaces etc. The journal also covers developments in crystallographic instrumentation and  apparatus, theory and interpretation and numerical analysis and other related subjects, together with information on crystallographic computer programs.

Abstracting and indexing
The journal is abstracted and indexed in:

References

External links 
 

Chemistry journals
Wiley-Blackwell academic journals
Bimonthly journals
Multilingual journals
Publications established in 1968